Janko Mavrović (born 24 October 1977) is a former Croatian team handball player who started out in left wing position and was later switched to centre back position. 

He played for his local hometown clubs RK Kvarner, RK Pećine, RK Zamet, RK Crikvenica from Crikvenica and RK Buzet from Buzet.

Honours
RK Buzet
Croatian First League (1): 2008-09

References

External links
EHF Profile
Premijer Liga Profile
RK Zamet Profile

1977 births
Living people
RK Crikvenica players
RK Zamet players
RK Kvarner players
Croatian male handball players
Handball players from Rijeka